Notre-Dame-du-Mont-Carmel was a former parish municipality in Le Haut-Richelieu Regional County Municipality in the Montérégie region of Quebec.  On September 13, 2001, it ceased to exist and merged with the village municipality of Lacolle to form the new municipality of Lacolle.

Education

The South Shore Protestant Regional School Board previously served the municipality.

References

Former municipalities in Quebec
Populated places disestablished in 2001